Neasden Foundation Football Club were a football club based in Neasden, in the London Borough of Brent, England. In 2007, the club was promoted to the Combined Counties League Division One. However, they failed to complete all their matches and were expelled from the Combined Counties League.

Defunct football clubs in England
Middlesex County Football League
Combined Counties Football League
Defunct football clubs in London
Association football clubs disestablished in 2008